Aquilegia pyrenaica, common name Pyrenean columbine, is a species of flowering plant in the family Ranunculaceae. It is endemic to the Pyrenees where it grows on grassland and in rocky places. It was first described in 1805 by Augustin Pyramus de Candolle who gave it the name Aquilegia pyrenaica.

Description
This plant is closely related to the taller Aquliegia alpina. Stem is usually simple, more or less glabrous. The leaves are bluish-green and trifoliate, the petioles clasping the stem. Technically, the blue spreading outer parts of the flower are sepals, and the paler blue inner parts are the true petals. The petals bear spurs at the back of the flower that contain nectar and attract the plant's pollinators. The spurs are long, slender and very little curved in this species, and the stamens are yellow and protruding. The carpels are not fused together. This plant blooms from April to June.

Habitat

Distribution
This species is native to France and the Pyrenees. It was introduced into cultivation in Britain in 1818, and in 1895, it was planted on rock ledges in Caenlochan Glen in Angus, Scotland, where it became naturalised. It has also appeared at Doncaster Sheffield Airport in 1986 as a casual arrival.

References

 Christoper Brickell (Editor-in-chief): RHS A-Z Encyclopedia of Garden Plants. Third edition. Dorling Kindersley, London 2003

pyrenaica